Sanna Saarinen (born 4 September 1991) is a Finnish football forward currently playing for PK-35 Vantaa.

Honours 
PK-35 Vantaa
Winner
 Finnish Championship (4): 2010, 2011, 2012, 2014
 Finnish Women's Cup (2): 2012, 2013

Runners-up
 Finnish Championship: 2013

External links 
 

1991 births
Living people
Women's association football forwards
Finnish women's footballers
Finland women's international footballers
Kansallinen Liiga players
PK-35 Vantaa (women) players